The APRA Music Awards of 2019 are the 37th annual awards given in the series of awards together known as APRA Awards, given in 2019. The awards are given in a series of categories in three divisions and in separate ceremonies throughout the year: the APRA Music Awards, Art Music Awards and Screen Music Awards. They are given by the Australasian Performing Right Association and the Australasian Mechanical Copyright Owners Society, known jointly as APRA AMCOS.

The Music Awards acknowledge outstanding achievements in contemporary songwriting, composing and publishing. The Music Awards ceremony was held on 30 April 2019 at the Melbourne Town Hall with Brian Nankervis as host; Sarah Aarons won four categories.

The Art Music Awards are provided in conjunction with the Australian Music Centre, and in 2019 the ceremony was held on 19 August at the Great Hall, University of Sydney. They were presented to "recognise achievement in the composition, performance, education and presentation of Australian art music. Art music covers activity across contemporary classical music, contemporary jazz and improvised music, experimental music and sound art."

The Screen Music Awards are run in conjunction with the Australian Guild of Screen Composers (AGSC), to "acknowledge excellence and innovation in the field of screen composition." Winners were announced on 20 November at a ceremony hosted by children's entertainer, Justine Clarke, at the Forum Melbourne.

Presenters

The APRA Music Awards ceremony was hosted by Brian Nankervis. Guest presenters were Tina Arena, Briggs, Tania Doko, Tim Rogers, Dallas Frasca, Louis Schoorl, Megan Washington, François Tétaz, M-Phazes and G Flip.

Performances

Performers on the night:
 The Rubens and Sarah Aarons - "Never Ever"
 Dean Lewis - "Stay Awake" 
 Middle Kids and J.P. Shilo - "With the One I Love" 
 J.P. Shilo, Fanny Lumsden and Henry Wagons - "Slow Mover"
 Radical Son and Samuel Pankhurst - "Native Tongue". 
 Electric Fields - "I Said Hi" 
 Max Sharam - "Society"

APRA Music Awards

Blues & Roots Work of the Year

Breakthrough Songwriter of the Year

Country Work of the Year

Dance Work of the Year

International Work of the Year

Licensee of the Year Award

Most Played Australian Work

Most Played Australian Work Overseas

Overseas Recognition Award

Pop Work of the Year

Rock Work of the Year

Song of the Year

Songwriter of the Year
 Sarah Aarons

Ted Albert Award for Outstanding Services to Australian Music
 Rob Potts

Outstanding International Achievement Award

Urban Work of the Year

Art Music Awards

Instrumental Work of the Year

Jazz Work of the Year

Orchestral Work of the Year

Vocal / Choral Work of the Year

Performance of the Year

Award for Excellence by an Individual

Award for Excellence by an Organisation

Award for Excellence in Music Education

Award for Excellence in a Regional Area

Award for Excellence in Experimental Music

Award for Excellence in Jazz

Distinguished Services to Australian Music

Screen Music Awards

Nominees and winners

Feature Film Score of the Year

Best Music for an Advertisement

Best Music for Children's Television

Best Music for a Documentary

Best Music for a Mini-Series or Telemovie

Best Music for a Short Film

Best Music for a Television Series or Serial

Best Original Song Composed for the Screen

Best Soundtrack Album

Best Television Theme

Most Performed Screen Composer – Australia

Most Performed Screen Composer – Overseas

References

2019 in Australian music
2019 music awards
APRA Awards